Spike Fuck (sometimes stylised as SPIKE FCUK & SPIKE F*CK) is an artist and musician from Melbourne, Australia.

Overview
Growing up in Melbourne, Australia, she began performing as Spike Fuck in 2015.

Her work draws primarily from her experience as a recovering addict and her struggle with gender dysphoria. She describes her musical style as "smackwave": a genre combining elements of new wave, post-punk and country music. She cites Roky Erickson and Scott Walker as important influences.

In 2019 she signed to Partisan Records and announced her plan to begin work on her first full-length release, BellaDonna DeathTrip

Work
Spike Fuck's debut EP, The Smackwave EP, was released in 2016. The EP was re-released in 2019. She has described it as an impersonation of a washed-up middle aged rock star attempting a comeback in the 1960s or 1970s.

In 2019 she released the single "Body by Crystal"; describing the song as an "over-produced pop-punk sound, like End of the Century-era Ramones".

In mid-2017, Spike released a country music single named "Suicide Party (Greatest Hits)". The track featured Graham "Evil" Lee of The Triffids. In August 2020, Spike then released "Kind Hearts"; a duet with Melbourne band The Slingers.

References

Living people
Musicians from Melbourne
21st-century Australian women singers
Australian women singer-songwriters
Transgender women musicians
Year of birth missing (living people)
Transgender singers